Ride 'Em Cowboy is a 1936 American Western film directed by Lesley Selander and written by Frances Guihan. The film stars Buck Jones, Luana Walters, Donald Kirke, George Cooper, J. P. McGowan and Joseph W. Girard. The film was released on September 20, 1936, by Universal Pictures.

Plot

Cast       
Buck Jones as Jess Burns 
Luana Walters as Lillian Howard
Donald Kirke as Sam Parker Jr.
George Cooper as Chuck Morse
J. P. McGowan as Jim Howard
Joseph W. Girard as Sam Parker 
Charles Le Moyne as Sheriff Stanton
W. E. Lawrence as Sandy Adams 
Silver as Silver

References

External links
 

1936 films
1930s English-language films
American Western (genre) films
1936 Western (genre) films
Universal Pictures films
Films directed by Lesley Selander
American black-and-white films
1930s American films